Brezovica is a settlement in the Štrpce municipality in Kosovo, known for its Brezovica ski resort. According to the 2011 Census, Brezovica's total population is 68.

Brezovica is one of the most visited winter tourist destinations in Kosovo. The ski resort area is ideally situated on the north and northwest-facing slopes of the Šar National Park. The ridge line spans 39,000 hectares of high alpine mountain terrain and forests, with a highly diverse and abundant flora and fauna. Located within 90 minutes of two international airports, the Brezovica resort area represents one of the last remaining under-developed ski resort areas in Southeast Europe.

Geography
It is situated in the northeastern part of the Šar Mountains, and in the drainage basin of the Lepenac river. The Brezovica ski resort is situated between 900 m and 2,500 m above sea level, about 14 km south of the village. There is a combination of mild valley climate in the lower parts and Alpine climate in the higher regions.

History

In Medieval Serbia, the župa (province) of Sirinić (first mentioned in a charter of the 13th century, the second time in 1331, in a charter of Emperor Stephen Dušan) existed, covering the whole of modern Štrpce municipality, having the cities of Gradište (in Brezovica) and Zidinac (in Gotovuša). Several remains of Byzantine forts exist in the region.

At the top of the Čajlije hill, above the mouth of the Piljevac creek of the Lepenac river, there exists the remains of the Gradište fort, which has two layers, the first from the 6th century, and the second from the 13th century. The fort is in ruins, of which a donjon tower, and outlines of other buildings, can be identified. The entrance to the city, at the north, was protected by a tower. From that tower, a rampart continued, with another tower, from where a defensive wall stretched to the foot of the hill, towards the Lepenac.

On 28 June 1944, during World War II, Bulgarian soldiers executed 46 locals (of whom 12 were children) at Rakanovac, in Brezovica, after the death of one of their soldiers.

Demographics

Annotations

References

External links
 viewkosova.com Brezovica
 Official site of the Brezovica Ski Center
 Brezovica.biz
 Kosovo Ski Holiday, 2016 NYTimes feature

Serbian enclaves in Kosovo
Ski areas and resorts in Kosovo
Šar Mountains
Villages in Štrpce